Guerra de Empresas (2012) (Spanish for "War of the Promotions") was an annual professional wrestling major event produced by Mexican professional wrestling promotion International Wrestling Revolution Group (IWRG), which took place on July 8, 2012 in Arena Naucalpan, Naucalpan, State of Mexico, Mexico. The event focused on an eight-tag team tournament between representatives of IWRG, AAA, Desastre Total Ultraviolento (DTU), La Familia de Tijuana (FdT) and Los Perros del Mal (PdM) to underline the "War of the Promotions" concept. While wrestlers all represented their "home" promotion they had competed on IWRG events prior to this event, either through IWRG's working relationship with AAA or due to be in independent contractors and not signed exclusively with one specific wrestling promotion.

Production

Background
The Guerra de Empresas ("War of the Promotions") concept is a recurring tournament between representatives of various Mexican wrestling promotions hosted by different promotions over time, International Wrestling Revolution Group (IWRG; Sometimes referred to as Grupo Internacional Revolución in Spanish) hosted the first one in 2010 and has hosted one or more Guerra de Empresas each year since then, while also sending representatives to other promotions for their Guerra de Empresas shows. The Guerra de Empresas tournament was normally a single-elimination tag team tournament with eight teams fighting for the trophy. The IWRG Guerra de Empresas shows, as well as the majority of the IWRG shows in general, are held in "Arena Naucalpan", owned by the promoters of IWRG and their main arena. The June 2011 Guerra de Empresas show was the fourth IWRG promoted a show under that name and the fifth time a Guerra de Empresas was held in Mexico.

Storylines
The event featured nine professional wrestling matches with different wrestlers involved in pre-existing scripted feuds, plots and storylines. Wrestlers were portrayed as either heels (referred to as rudos in Mexico, those that portray the "bad guys") or faces (técnicos in Mexico, the "good guy" characters) as they followed a series of tension-building events, which culminated in a wrestling match or series of matches.  IWRG's Guerra de Empresas series of events all center on inter-promotional competition with tag teams representing IWRG as well as a number of other wrestling promotions represented by one or more tag teams. IWRG's Guerra de Empresas series of events all center around inter-promotional competition with tag teams representing IWRG as well as a number of other wrestling promotions represented by one or more tag teams.

The 2012 Guerra de Empresas heavily focused on the rivalry between IWRG and AAA, with whom they have had a working relationship for years. In storyline terms the team of Damian 666 and X-Fly represented La Familia de Tijuana, which is not a wrestling promotion but a group of wrestlers who work for a number of different promotions. The tournament also included a team from Desastre Total Ultraviolento (DTU) as well as the Los Perros del Mal (PdM) promotion that both have worked on IWRG shows in the past and have had IWRG wrestlers work on their shows as well.

Guerra de Empresas 2013 participants

Results

References

External links 
 

2012 in professional wrestling
2012 in Mexico
2012
July 2012 events in Mexico